The Volusia Bar Light was a river lighthouse marking the inlet of the St. Johns River into the south end of Lake George, Florida.

History
The light was removed in 1916, but a foghorn remained active until 1943. The building was burned by vandals in 1974. The foundation pilings still show above the water.

The keeper, A. J. Anderson, was murdered in 1938. Mariners noticed that the light was unattended. His body was found floating face-down in the river after he had been missing for more than a week. An autopsy established that his neck had been broken. The lighthouse had been ransacked, and Anderson had apparently struggled with his attacker. The murder has never been solved.

References

 - retrieved February 27, 2006

Lighthouses completed in 1886
Houses completed in 1886
Lighthouses in Florida
1886 establishments in Florida